Auce is a town in southern Latvia, Dobele Municipality near the Lithuanian border.

History 
Before 13th century the territory of Auce was a part of a Semigallian Spārnene county.
After the partition of Semigallia in 1254 territory was granted to the Archbishopric of Riga.
Auce is first mentioned in written sources in 1426 as Owcze.
In 1616 Old Auce manor is mentioned for the first time when there was held regional assembly (landtag) of the Duchy of Courland.
In 1667 the first Lutheran church was erected in Auce. From 1768 until the Latvian agrarian reforms in the 1920s, Old Auce manor was property of the Baltic German von Medem family.

Auce village started rapid development after the construction of the Jelgava-Mažeikiai railway in 1889.
During the World War I Auce was occupied by the Imperial German army. The Germans established an aviation school and airfield (Artillerie-Fliegerschule Ost I) nearby.

After the Latvian War of Independence Auce became part of the Republic of Latvia. In 1920 Old Auce manor was nationalised and it became the property of the University of Latvia, to be used as a teaching farm for students of agriculture. In 1924 Auce received town rights. Was Auce has been the centre of the Auce municipality. But in 2021 Auce Municipality was merged with the Dobele Municipality.

See also
List of cities in Latvia

References

External links

 
Towns in Latvia
1426 establishments in Europe
Dobele Municipality
Semigallia